Yeshwanthpur is a metro station on the Green Line of the Namma Metro serving the Yeshwanthpur area of Bangalore, India. It was opened to the public on 1 March 2014.

Skywalk
The BMRC has proposed constructing a skywalk linking Platform 6 of Yesvantpur Junction railway station with the "E" entrance of the metro station. The skywalk is estimated to cost . Although the skywalk was first proposed shortly after the metro station's opening in 2014, disagreements over funding have delayed its construction. The BMRC wants the cost to be split evenly with the Indian Railways. However, the Railways believes that the BMRC must bear the entire cost. A Railway official stated, "The rules are quite clear on this matter. Whenever a second government agency creates a new infrastructure project at any specific place and any public amenity needs to be created for that, the onus is on the new entrant to bear the costs of the project. Metro feels the need for it and it needs to be ready to fund it. Why should Railways bear the cost for something that Metro requires?"

The BMRC finalized plans for the skywalk and received clearance for construction from the South Western Railway's Bengaluru division on 12 April 2019.

Station layout

Connections
The station is located opposite to the Yeshvantapur railway station.

Entry/Exits
There are 7 Entry/Exit points – A, B, C, D, E, F and G. Commuters can use either of the points for their travel.

Gallery

See also
Bangalore
List of Namma Metro stations
Transport in Karnataka
List of metro systems
List of rapid transit systems in India

References

External links

 Bangalore Metro Rail Corporation Ltd. (Official site) 
 UrbanRail.Net – descriptions of all metro systems in the world, each with a schematic map showing all stations.

Namma Metro stations
Railway stations in India opened in 2014
2014 establishments in Karnataka
Railway stations in Bangalore